Ashdown is an English surname. Notable people with the surname include:

Bill Ashdown (1898–1979), English cricketer
David Ashdown, Bishop of Keewatin
Doug Ashdown (born 1942), Australian singer-songwriter
George Ashdown (1851–1939), Canadian politician
Hugh Ashdown (1904–1977), Bishop of Newcastle
Isabel Ashdown (born 1970), British author
James Henry Ashdown (1844–1924), Canadian merchant
Jamie Ashdown (born 1980), English footballer
Joe Ashdown (1922–1982), Australian rules footballer
John Ashdown-Hill (born 1949), British historian
Paddy Ashdown (1941–2018), British politician
Pete Ashdown (born 1967), US businessman and politician
Peter Ashdown (born 1934), English racing driver
Richard Ashdown (born 1978), English darts master of ceremonies
Simon Ashdown, British television writer

See also 
 William Ashdowne (1723–1810), English Unitarian preacher

English-language surnames